Ioanna Chatziioannou (born October 22, 1973 in Germany) is a retired female weightlifter from Greece. She became an Olympic medalist during the 2000 Summer Olympics when she won the bronze medal in the women's – 63 kg class.

External links 
sports-reference

1973 births
Living people
Greek female weightlifters
Weightlifters at the 2000 Summer Olympics
Olympic bronze medalists for Greece
Olympic weightlifters of Greece
Olympic medalists in weightlifting
Medalists at the 2000 Summer Olympics
European Weightlifting Championships medalists